Belluno railway station serves the town and comune of Belluno, in the Veneto region, northeastern Italy.  Opened in 1912, it forms part of the Calalzo–Padua railway.

The station is currently owned by Rete Ferroviaria Italiana (RFI).  The commercial area of the passenger building is managed by Centostazioni.  Train services to and from the station are regional trains operated by Trenitalia.  Each of these companies is a subsidiary of Ferrovie dello Stato (FS), Italy's state-owned rail company.

History
The first Belluno railway station, located in Piazza Cesare Battisti, was opened on 11 November 1886, on completion of the Belluno-Cornuda portion of the historical line Belluno–Montebelluna–Treviso.

The current station was opened in 1912, upon the activation of the first leg (up to Longarone) of the Calalzo–Padua railway.  The passenger building, which was a project of the architect Roberto Narducci, was constructed in 1928.

Features
There are four tracks running through the station.  Three of them are equipped with platforms.  Additionally, the station has three sidings used to store trains.

Train services
The station has about one million passenger movements each year.
 
The station is served by the following services:

Regional services (Treno regionale) Belluno - Conegliano - Venezia S. Lucia
Regional services (Treno regionale) Montebelluna - Belluno
Regional services (Treno regionale) Belluno - Ponte nelle Alpi-Polpet - Calalzo-Pieve di Cadore-Cortina
Regional services (Treno regionale) Vicenza - Padua - Castelfranco Veneto - Montebelluna - Belluno - Ponte nelle Alpi-Polpet - Calalzo-Pieve di Cadore-Cortina

Gallery

References

External links

This article is based upon a translation of the Italian language version as at December 2010.

Railway stations in Veneto
Railway Station
Railway stations opened in 1912
1912 establishments in Italy
Railway stations in Italy opened in the 20th century